Uralakalasi Nayana Malinga de Silva (born 2 August 1995) is a Sri Lankan cricketer. He made his first-class debut for Bloomfield Cricket and Athletic Club in the 2015–16 Premier League Tournament on 11 December 2015. He made his List A debut for Sri Lanka Ports Authority Cricket Club in the 2017–18 Premier Limited Overs Tournament on 18 March 2018.

References

External links
 

1995 births
Living people
Sri Lankan cricketers
Bloomfield Cricket and Athletic Club cricketers
Cricketers from Colombo